The 2003 Coupe de la Ligue Final was a football match played at Stade de France, Saint-Denis on 17 May 2003 that saw AS Monaco FC defeat FC Sochaux-Montbéliard 4-1 thanks to goals by Ludovic Giuly (2), Sébastien Squillaci and Dado Prso.

Match details

External links
Report on LFP official site

2003
Coupe De La Ligue Final 2003
Coupe De La Ligue Final 2003
Coupe De La Ligue Final 
Coupe De La Ligue Final 
Sport in Saint-Denis, Seine-Saint-Denis
Football competitions in Paris
Coupe De La Ligue Final